The China men's national water polo team represents China in international water polo competitions and friendly matches. It is one of the leading teams in Asia.

Results

Olympic Games

1984 – 9th place
1988 – 11th place
2008 – 12th place

World Championship

1982 – 10th place
1991 – 14th place
2003 – 16th place
2005 – 16th place
2007 – 13th place
2009 – 12th place
2011 – 15th place
2013 – 14th place
2015 – 15th place

World Cup
2010 – 7th place

World League

 2005 – 13th place
 2006 – 8th place
 2007 – 8th place
 2008 – 9th place
 2010 – 7th place
 2011 – 8th place
 2012 – 6th place
 2013 – 6th place
 2014 – 8th place
 2015 – 8th place
 2016 – 8th place
 2017 – Intercontinental Preliminary round
 2018 – Intercontinental Preliminary round
 2019 – Intercontinental Preliminary round

Asian Games

 1974 –  Silver medal
 1978 –  Gold medal
 1982 –  Gold medal 
 1986 –  Gold medal
 1990 –  Gold medal
 1994 –  Silver medal
 1998 –  Bronze medal
 2002 –  Bronze medal
 2006 –  Gold medal
 2010 –  Silver medal
 2014 –  Bronze medal
 2018 – 4th place

Asian Swimming Championships

2012 –  Gold medal
2016 –  Bronze medal

Asian Water Polo Championship

2009 –  Gold medal
2012 –  Silver medal
2015 –  Silver medal

Asian Cup

 2010 –  Gold medal
 2013 – 4th place

References

 
Men's national water polo teams
Men's national sports teams of China